Jeffrey Eugene Mullis (December 27, 1959) is an American politician who is a member of the Georgia State Senate. A member of the Republican Party, he has represented the 53rd district since 2001 after an unsuccessful run for state senator in 1998.

Mullis is from Chickamauga.  He currently serves as the Northwest Georgia Joint Development Authority Executive Director and the Top of Georgia Economic Development Chairman. He is married to Teresa Nichols, and has three children.

In 2021, Mullis sponsored elections reform legislation in Georgia. The bill would end no-excuse absentee voting and restrict absentee voting to those who are over 75, have a physical disability or are out of town.  He sponsored the legislation during the COVID-19 pandemic and shortly after the 2020 elections where Democratic candidates won both of Georgia's U.S. Senate, as well as Georgia's electoral college votes in the presidential election.

Political career
Mullis has served in the 146th, 147th, 148th and 149th Georgia General Assemblies.

Current Georgia State Senate positions
  Committees
 Rules - Chairman
 Chairman of the Economic Development Subcommittee of Senate Appropriations
 Rules - Chairman
 Appropriations - Member
 Banking and Financial Institutions - Member
 Economic Development - Member
  Caucuses
 Republican Caucus – Vice-chairman
 Sportsman's Caucus – Co-chairman

Awards 
 2020 Legislative Champion of the Year. Named by the Georgia Academy of Family Physicians (GAFP).

See also

 List of state government committees (Georgia)

References

External links
 Welcome to the Georgia General Assembly! Legis.ga.gov. Retrieved June 10, 2013.
 https://ballotpedia.org/Jeff_Mullis

Republican Party Georgia (U.S. state) state senators
Living people
People from Walker County, Georgia
21st-century American politicians
1959 births